Krasnozavodsk (lit. Population:

History
It was founded in 1915 as a settlement servicing a mechanical factory and initially had no name. After 1917, it was called Vozrozhdeniye (lit. revival), Zagorsky, due to its vicinity to Zagorsk (now Sergiyev Posad); and Krasnozavodsky. In 1940, it was granted town status and given its present name. On December 8, 1999, a part of Krasnozavodsk containing the research institute and the nearby settlement of Novostroyka were incorporated into the new town of Peresvet. The process was finalized on March 28, 2000.

Administrative and municipal status
Within the framework of administrative divisions, it is, together with two rural localities, incorporated within Sergiyevo-Posadsky District as the Town of Krasnozavodsk. As a municipal division, the Town of Krasnozavodsk is incorporated within Sergiyevo-Posadsky Municipal District as Krasnozavodsk Urban Settlement.

References

Notes

Sources

Cities and towns in Moscow Oblast